Dead & Beautiful is a 2021 drama film directed by David Verbeek. An international co-production of the Netherlands and Taiwan, the film premiered on the International Film Festival Rotterdam. It also played at the Imagine Film Festival and the Netherlands Film Festival.

Plot
A group of young and spoiled rich kids turn into vampires after a night out, changing the course of their lives and driving a wedge between them all.

Cast
 Gijs Blom as Mason
 Philip Juan as Bin-Ray
 Anna Marchenko as Anastasia
 Yen Tsao as Alexander
 Aviis Zhong as Lulu

References

External links 
 

2021 films
Dutch drama films
Taiwanese drama films
English-language Dutch films
English-language Taiwanese films
2020s Mandarin-language films
2021 drama films
2021 multilingual films
Dutch multilingual films
Taiwanese multilingual films